The Bubenholz Tunnel is a motorway tunnel in the Swiss canton of Zurich. It forms part of the A51 motorway, which links the A1 motorway with Zurich Airport.

The tunnel replaced several overpasses which existed until the early 2000s, with the intention of cutting noise in the nearby towns of Glattbrugg and Opfikon.

References 

Road tunnels in Switzerland
Buildings and structures in the canton of Zürich